Decatopseustis is a genus of moths in the family Gelechiidae.

Species
 Decatopseustis cataphanes Common, 1958
 Decatopseustis xanthastis (Lower, 1896)

References

Pexicopiini
Taxa named by Edward Meyrick
Moth genera